Lovely, Still is a 2008 American romantic drama film directed by Nik Fackler. It stars Martin Landau, Ellen Burstyn, Adam Scott, and Elizabeth Banks.

Plot 
Lonely Robert Malone (Landau) falls in love with Mary (Burstyn), the mother of his neighbor Alex (Banks). With the help of his boss Mike (Scott), Robert decides to spend Christmas with someone for the first time. Over a period of a few days and with the "co-conspiratorial help" from the grocery store manager, as a couple they enjoy several activities leading up to Christmas, including things like a carriage ride, a shopping spree, attending a musical performance together, and a party. At the party, Robert mistakenly accuses another older man of being the rotten, no good husband who had left Mary before.  As the story progresses, we begin to understand that Mary knows a lot more and is much more concerned about making Robert happy day-by-day than might be otherwise expected for a senior couple, including moments of quiet intimacy. As the film draws to a close, we find out that Alex, Mike, Mary, and even the "alleged" boyfriend are all part of the story, as it is Robert's condition of Alzheimer's / senile dementia taking him away from them for days at a time, leading to a very sweet ending.

Cast 
 Martin Landau as Robert Malone 
 Ellen Burstyn as Mary 
 Adam Scott as Mike
 Elizabeth Banks as Alex

Production 
Filming took place in Omaha, Nebraska. It first premiered at the Toronto International Film Festival and continued to other film festivals.

Reception 
On Rotten Tomatoes, the film holds an approval rating of 73% based on 22 reviews.

References

External links 
 
 

2008 romantic drama films
2008 films
American Christmas films
American independent films
American romantic drama films
Films about Alzheimer's disease
Films about old age
Films shot in Nebraska
2000s American films
2008 independent films
Films about disability